Air New England Flight 248 was a De Havilland DHC-6 Twin Otter that crashed on approach to Barnstable Municipal Airport  in Barnstable County, Massachusetts, on 17 June 1979. All of those on the aircraft survived with the exception of the pilot, who was killed instantly.

Flight designations, route, and crew
At 10:48 p.m. EDT on 17 June 1979, Flight 248, with eight passengers and a crew of two, crashed in a heavily wooded area in the Yarmouth Port section of Yarmouth, Massachusetts, about 1.5 miles (2.4 km) northeast of Barnstable Municipal Airport while on an instrument landing system (ILS) approach. The crash occurred on the end of a flight from LaGuardia Airport in New York, New York. The aircraft, piloted by Air New England co-founder George Parmenter, was several miles short of the runway.

Crash
The aircraft crashed in the middle of Camp Greenough, a heavily wooded Boy Scouts of America camp. Parmenter was killed in the crash. The co-pilot and several passengers were injured.

An uninjured passenger managed to make her way through thick brush to the Mid Cape Highway (Route 6), and flagged down a passing car. The motorist drove her to the airport, where she alerted authorities to the crash. Rescuers, with the aid of a brush-clearing truck, were able to cut a swath through the brush to the crash site and aid the survivors.

Book
In June 2009, author Robert Sabbag, one of the passengers on board Air New England Flight 248, released a book called Down Around Midnight (Viking Adult), a first-hand account of the crash from survivors and rescuers.

See also
Aviation safety
Emergency landing
List of accidents and incidents involving commercial aircraft

References

External links 
Accident Details
Accident description

Airliner accidents and incidents in Massachusetts
Accidents and incidents involving the de Havilland Canada DHC-6 Twin Otter
Air New England (1970–1981) accidents and incidents
Yarmouth, Massachusetts
History of Barnstable County, Massachusetts
1979 in Massachusetts
Aviation accidents and incidents in the United States in 1979
June 1979 events in the United States